Berenice (Bereníkē) is the Ancient Macedonian form of the Attic Greek name  Pherenikē, which means "bearer of victory" . Berenika, priestess of Demeter in Lete ca. 350 BC, is the oldest epigraphical evidence. The name also has the form Bernice.

Many historical figures bear the name Berenice:

Ancient world

Ptolemaic and Seleucid queens and royal daughters in Cyrenaica and Egypt
 Berenice I of Egypt ( – between 279 and 268 BC), mother of Magas of Cyrene and wife of Ptolemy I of Egypt
 Berenice II of Egypt (267 or 266 BC – 221 BC), daughter of Magas of Cyrene, wife of Ptolemy III of Egypt and traditional namesake of the constellation Coma Berenices
 Berenice III of Egypt (120–80 BC), daughter of Ptolemy IX of Egypt; she first married Ptolemy X of Egypt, and later Ptolemy XI of Egypt
 Berenice IV of Egypt (77–55 BC), daughter of Ptolemy XII of Egypt and elder sister of Cleopatra VII

 Berenice (Seleucid queen) (died 246 BC), daughter of Ptolemy II of Egypt and wife of Seleucid monarch Antiochus II Theos
 Berenice (daughter of Ptolemy II of Telmessos) (3rd to 2nd century BC), great-granddaughter of Ptolemy Epigonos

Judean princesses
 Berenice (daughter of Salome) (1st century BC), daughter of Salome I, a sister of Herod the Great. and mother of Herod Agrippa
 Berenice (28–?), a daughter of Herod Agrippa, wife of Herod of Chalcis until 48, then spent much of her life at the court of her brother, Herod Agrippa II
 Berenice (after 50–?), daughter of another daughter of Herod Agrippa I

Saints
 Berenice, also known as Saint Veronica, 1st-century saint from Jerusalem
 Domnina, Berenice, and Prosdoce, 4th-century Christian martyrs

Others
 Berenice of Chios (d. 72/71 BC), third wife of Mithridates VI of Pontus
 The daughter in the Exorcism of the Syrophoenician woman's daughter

Modern era
 Berenice Abbott (1898–1991), American photographer
 Bérénice Bejo (born 1976), French-Argentine actress
 Berenice Celeyta, Colombian human rights activist
 Bérénice Marlohe, (born 1979), French actress
 Maé-Bérénice Méité, French figure skater
 Bernice Slote (1913-1983), Poet and Willa Cather scholar
 Bernice Williams, American raunchy blues singer
 Berenice Sydney (1944–1983), English artist

References

Sources
Berenice Dictionary of Greek and Roman Biography and Mythology